The Ducal Palace of Pastrana (Spanish: Palacio Ducal de Pastrana) is a palace located in Pastrana, Spain. It was declared Bien de Interés Cultural in 1941.

References 

Bien de Interés Cultural landmarks in the Province of Guadalajara
Palaces in Castilla–La Mancha